Yeli Daraq-e Olya is a village in Nazarkahrizi Rural District, Nazarkahrizi District, Hashtrud County, East Azerbaijan Province, Iran. At the 2006 census, its population was 178, in 46 families.

References 

Towns and villages in Hashtrud County